Spilodiscus flohri is a species of clown beetles in the family Histeridae. It is found in Central America and North America.

References

 Caterino, Michael S. (1998). "A phylogenetic revision of Spilodiscus Lewis (Coleoptera: Histeridae)". Journal of Natural History, vol. 32, no. 8, 1129–1168.
 Mazur, Slawomir (1997). "A world catalogue of the Histeridae (Coleoptera: Histeroidea)". Genus, International Journal of Invertebrate Taxonomy (Supplement), 373.

Further reading

 Arnett, R.H. Jr., M. C. Thomas, P. E. Skelley and J. H. Frank. (eds.). (2002). American Beetles, Volume II: Polyphaga: Scarabaeoidea through Curculionoidea. CRC Press LLC, Boca Raton, FL.
 Arnett, Ross H. (2000). American Insects: A Handbook of the Insects of America North of Mexico. CRC Press.
 Richard E. White. (1983). Peterson Field Guides: Beetles. Houghton Mifflin Company.

Histeridae
Beetles described in 1898